Bad Boy Johnny and the Prophets of Doom is a rock stage musical first performed in Australia in 1989. It is a satire on religion and rock and roll.

History

Written in 1986 by Daniel Abineri it premiered in Melbourne in 1989 and featured Russell Crowe in the title role. Bad Boy Johnny enjoyed a six-month run in Melbourne and Sydney, won two International Pater Awards for best libretto and score, and spawned a cast album on WEA and a top ten single "Enemy The Sun". The late Australian pop singer Troy Newman who took over the title role, is heard on the official cast album and single in place of Russell Crowe.

In April 1993 a showcase performance of the musical, directed by Daniel Abineri was performed at Jacksons Lane Community Theatre N6. Performing in the cast were 1980s pop band Then Jerico singer Mark Shaw in the title role, Daniel Abineri as Father McLean, with Elizabeth Carling from TV's drama series Boon, Sebastian Abineri as Pope Liberty III, Jody Saron as Desire and Cathy Murphy and Matt Selby in supporting roles.

On 26 January 1994, Bad Boy Johnny was re-mounted as a five-week limited showcase run at The Union Chapel in Islington London, again directed by Daniel Abineri and starring Craig Ferguson and Mark Shaw it also featured Cornel John as Charlie Fortune, Anna Jacysaon as Mary, Eve Barker as Desire, Stephen Marcus as Pope Liberty, and Sandra Bee, Perry Benson, Louisa Casano, Mark Frost, Daniel Kyle and Louise Anne Wesley as the ensemble.

The 1994 London production made national news when it caused grave offence to the Roman Catholic Church and was closed down after just nine performances.

Synopsis
Born on the wrong side of the tracks to a single mother and part-time prostitute called Mary, Johnny steals his first guitar and forms a band, the Prophets Of Doom. He is discovered and managed by his evil parish priest Father MacLean.

Booked onto an X Factor-type show called Have Your Say, Johnny is voted by the public as the person the world would like to see as the new Pontiff. However, the current incumbent, the obese Pope Liberty III, is not going to step down. Enter Johnny's number one fan Desire who, disguised as a nun, tries to seduce Liberty, leading him to die of a massive heart attack.

So Johnny is ordained as the people's Pope. However, he learns that MacLean raped his mother in the confessional box when she was just sixteen and that he is in fact Johnny's father. Things get even worse for Johnny when it then transpires that Maclean murdered Mary in order to get his hands on Johnny. Johnny swears revenge, so MacLean plans to have his client assassinated live on his TV show, The Vatican Tonite.

Original song list 
Taken from the 1990 CD recording.

 Let us Pray  performed by Father MacLean
 Another Day  performed by Mary
 Bad Boy Johnny  performed by Johnny and the Prophets of Doom
 What U Want  performed by Charlie Fortune and the Prophets of Doom
 Have Your Say  performed by Johnny and the Prophets of Doom
 Maybe He's The One  performed by the Cardinals
 Enemy The Sun  performed by Johnny
 Kissing God  performed by Desire
 Make me Divine  performed by Mary and Father MacLean
 Bye Bye Johnny performed by Father Maclean
 I Believe  performed by Johnny

Song List (2010 UK Tour)

 Intro  performed by Johnny
 Let Us Pray  performed by Father MacLean
 Another Day  performed by Mary
 Sweet Virgin Mary  performed by Johnny
 Kissing God (once)  performed by Desire
 Bad Boy Johnny  performed by Johnny and the Prophets of Doom
 What U Want  performed by Johnny
 Have Your Say  performed by Charlie Fortune
 Nobody Told Me  performed by Pope Liberty
 Have Your Say (reprise)  performed by Charlie Fortune and the Prophets of Doom
Interval
 Maybe He's The One  performed by the Cardinals
 Johnny Is The King  performed by Father MacLean
 Enemy The Sun performed by Johnny
 Kissing God (twice)  performed by Desire
 Make Me Divine  performed by Mary and Father MacLean
 Bye Bye Johnny  performed by Father MacLean
 The Power & the Glory  performed by Johnny
 Let Us Pay  performed by Father MacLean
 I Believe  performed by Johnny

Productions
1989 Australian Cast 
Russell Crowe as Johnny
Troy Newman as Johnny
Daniel Abineri as Father MacLean
Wendy Stapleton as Mary
Gary Olsen as Pope Liberty III
Steve Bastoni as Charlie Fortune
Nadine Garner as Desire
Brian Mannix, Wayne Pygram and Michael-John Hurney as The Cardinals

1993 London Showcase Cast 
Mark Shaw  as Johnny
Daniel Abineri  as Father MacLean
Elizabeth Carling  as Mary
Matt Selby as Charlie Fortune
Sebastian Abineri as Pope Liberty
Jody Saron as Desire

1994 London cast
Mark Shaw  as Johnny
Craig Ferguson  as Father MacLean
Stephen Marcus as Pope Liberty
Cornel John as Charlie Fortune
Anna Jacysaon as Mary
Eve Barker as Desire
Sandra Bee, Perry Benson, Louisa Casano, Mark Frost, Daniel Kyle and Louise Anne Wesley as Cardinals/Ensemble

2010 UK touring cast
Directed by Daniel Abineri 
Steve Steinman as Father Maclean 
Dawn Spence as Mary 
Henry Bird as Bad Boy Johnny 
Emily Clark as Desire 
Mike Taylor as Pope Liberty 
Nick Newbould as Charlie Fortune

Band 
Jordan Bracewell (guitar) 
Ben Grimsley (bass guitar)
Nickky Miller (drums) 
Arthur Bird (keys) 
Laura Manship (sax)

Nuns backing vocals
Jodie Cooper 
Chloe Bass 
Emily Clark 
Shereen Webb

Cast recordings 
In 1989 an LP cast recording of the 1989 Australian production was released on WEA 903171155–1.

In 1990 a CD cast recording of the 1989 Australian production was released on WEA 003171155–2.

Although it is noted that the title of the show differs and is called "Bad Boy Johnny and the Profits of Doom" and not "Prophets"

Extra songs "Sweet Virgin Mary" performed by Johnny in the show and "Nobody Told Me" performed by Pope Liberty did not feature on either the LP or CD.

Singles

Notes

External links

International Herald Tribute referencing play

1989 musicals
Rock musicals